TKC may refer to:

The Kennel Club
The King's College (New York)
The King's Consort
 Tonnerre Yaoundé (Tonnerre Kalara Club), a sports club in Cameroon
Turkcell